The Blohm & Voss BV 141 was a World War II German tactical reconnaissance aircraft, notable for its uncommon structural asymmetry. Although the Blohm & Voss BV 141 performed well, it was never ordered into full-scale production, for reasons that included the unavailability of the preferred engine and competition from another tactical reconnaissance aircraft, the Focke-Wulf Fw 189.

Development
In 1937, the German Air Ministry – the Reichsluftfahrtministerium (RLM) – issued a specification for a single-engine reconnaissance aircraft with optimal visual characteristics. The preferred contractor was Arado with the Ar 198, but the prototype proved unsuccessful. The eventual winner was the Focke-Wulf Fw 189 Uhu; even though its twin-boom design using two smaller engines did not match the requirement of a single engined aircraft. Blohm & Voss (Hamburger Flugzeugbau) although not invited to participate, pursued as a private venture something far more radical. The proposal of chief designer Dr. Richard Vogt was the uniquely asymmetric BV 141.

Design
The Plexiglas-glazed crew gondola on the starboard side strongly resembled that found on the Fw 189, and housed the pilot, observer and rear gunner, while the fuselage on the port side led smoothly from the BMW 132N radial engine to a tail unit.

At first glance, the placement of weight would have induced tendency to roll, but the weight was evenly supported by lift from the wings.

In terms of thrust vs drag asymmetry, the countering of induced yaw was a more complicated matter. At low airspeed, it was calculated to be mostly alleviated because of a phenomenon known as P-factor, while at normal airspeed it proved to be easily controlled with trimming.

The tailplane was symmetrical at first, but in the 141B it became asymmetrical – starboard tailplane virtually removed – to improve the rear gunner's fields of view and fire.

Operational history

Three prototypes and an evaluation batch of five BV 141As were produced, backed personally by Ernst Udet, but the RLM decided on 4 April 1940 that they were underpowered, although it was also noted they otherwise exceeded the requirements. By the time a batch of 12 BV 141Bs were built with the more powerful BMW 801 engines, they were too late to make an impression, as the RLM had already decided to put the Fw 189 into production. An urgent need for BMW 801 engines for use in the Fw 190 fighter aircraft reduced the chance of the BV 141B being produced in quantity.

Vogt came up with several other asymmetric designs, including the piston-jet P.194.01, but none of those were actually built.

Several wrecked BV 141s were found by advancing Allied forces. One was captured by British forces and sent to England for examination. No examples survive today.

Variants

All 20 of the BV 141Bs that were ordered were produced and delivered. There exists a complete record of BV 141 production with either a German civil registration number or pre-military, four letter Stammkennzeichen factory radio code number.

Prototypes
Ha 141-0 - D-ORJE; original designation of the first aircraft completed with the stepped cockpit nacelle. Became the BV 141 V2.
BV 141 V1 - WNr 141-00-0171; D-OTTO then BL+AU, damaged
BV 141 V2 - WNr 141-00-0172; D-ORJE then PC+BA; chronologically, the first one built and the only one known under old "Ha" designation as "Ha 141"
BV 141 V3 - WNr 141-00-0359; D-OLGA then BL+AA

Pre-series BV 141 A-0
BV 141 A-01
(V4); WNr 01010360; D-OLLE; damaged

BV 141 A-02
(V5); WNr 01010361; BL+AB

BV 141 A-03
(V6); WNr 01010362; BL+AC

BV 141 A-04
(V7); WNr 01010363; BL+AD

BV 141 A-05
(V8); WNr 01010364; BL+AE

Pre-series BV 141 B-0
The first to have BMW 801 engine. About 2 m longer and 2 m wider than A-05.
B-01 (V9)  - WNr 0210001; NC+QZ; first flown 9 January 1941, had severe structural problem
B-02 (V10) - WNr 0210002; NC+RA; first flown 1 June 1941
B-03 (V11) - WNr 0210003; NC+RB
B-04 (V12) - WNr 0210004; NC+RC
B-05 (V13) - WNr 0210005; NC+RD
B-06 (V14) - WNr 0210006; NC+RE
B-07 (V15) - WNr 0210007; NC+RF
B-08 (V16) - WNr 0210008; NC+RG
B-09 (V17) - WNr 0210009; NC+RH
B-10 (V18) - WNr 0210010; NC+RI

Series BV 141 B-1
WNr 0210011; GK+GA
WNr 0210012; GK+GB
WNr 0210013; GK+GC
WNr 0210014; GK+GD
WNr 0210015; GK+GE
WNr 0210016; GK+GF
WNr 0210017; GK+GG
WNr 0210018; GK+GH
WNr 0210019; GL+AG; rebuilt D-OTTO
WNr 0210020; GL+AH; rebuilt D-OLLE

Specifications (BV 141 B-02 [V10])

See also

References

Notes

Citations

Bibliography
 Green, William. Warplanes of the Third Reich. London: Macdonald and Jane's, 1979, pp. 81–86. .
 

 
 Smith, J. Richard and Anthony Kay. German Aircraft of the Second World War. London: Putnam & Co, 1978, Third impression, pp. 66–71. .
 Taylor, Michael. The World's Strangest Aircraft. London: Grange, 1999. .
 Wood, Anthony and Bill Gunston. Hitler's Luftwaffe: A Pictorial History and Technical Encyclopedia of Hitler's Air Power in World War II. London: Salamander, 1977, p. 135. .

External links

 Blohm & Voss BV 141, VR Curassow.

Single-engined tractor aircraft
1930s German military reconnaissance aircraft
World War II reconnaissance aircraft of Germany
Asymmetrical aircraft
BV 141
Aircraft first flown in 1938